Constanţa railway station is the largest station in Constanţa and on the Romanian Black Sea coast.

This station is situated on the main Căile Ferate Române Line 800 (Bucharest – Feteşti – Constanţa – Mangalia). Constanţa railway station is served by about 50 passenger trains. During summer, the number of trains and passengers greatly expands.

The station is served by several bus and minibuses lines.

Distance from other railway stations

Romania
Arad (via Alba Iulia): 845 km
Arad (via Craiova): 829 km
Bacău: 381 km
Baia Mare (via Comănești): 838 km
Braşov (via București Nord): 391 km
Brăila: 256 km
Buzău: 208 km
Cluj-Napoca (via București Nord): 722 km
Craiova: 434 km
Deva (via Craiova): 680 km
Iaşi: 430 km
Oradea: 875 km
Piteşti: 333 km
Sibiu: 540 km
Suceava: 527 km
Timișoara: 758 km

Europe
Belgrade: 934 km
Berlin: 2,125 km
Budapest: 1,097 km
Chişinău: 556 km
Frankfurt am Main: 2,125 km
Kyiv: 1,452 km
Sofia: 764 km
Venice: 1,948 km
Wien: 1,370 km

External links
Trains timetable

Railway stations in Romania
Buildings and structures in Constanța